The Peter the Great Naval Corps - Saint Petersburg Naval Institute, formerly known as the M. V. Frunze Higher Naval School (named after Mikhail Frunze, in ), is the oldest of the Russian Navy's naval officer commissioning schools. It is located in Saint Petersburg.

History
The school traces its origins to the School of Mathematics and Navigation Sciences, founded in 1701 by Peter the Great, in Moscow's Sukharev Tower.  After the city of Saint Petersburg was built, the school was relocated there.  The school was later reorganized as the Naval Cadet Corps.  After the Russian Revolution of 1917, it was eventually renamed to M.V. Frunze Higher Naval School.  Today, it is called the Peter the Great Naval Corps - Saint Petersburg Naval Institute.

Other Russian Navy officer commissioning schools include F.F. Ushakov Baltic Naval Institute in Kaliningrad; A.A. Popov Naval Radioelectronics Institute in Petrodvorets (Saint Petersburg area); the Naval Engineering Institute in Pushkin (Saint Petersburg area); Pacific Higher Naval School in Vladivostok, and the Nakhimov Naval Academy in Sevastopol.

Historical Name Progression (in translation)

1701-1752  - School of Mathematic and Navigational Sciences, Moscow
1715-1752  - Academy of the Naval Guard, Saint Petersburg
1752-1802  - Naval Gentry Cadet Corps, Saint Petersburg (1771-1796 - Kronshtadt)
1802-1867  - Naval Cadet Corps, Saint Petersburg
1867-1891  - Naval School, Saint Petersburg
1891-1906  - Naval Cadet Corps, Saint Petersburg
1906-1916  - Naval Corps, Petrograd
1916-1918  - Naval School, Petrograd
1918-1919  - Fleet Command Courses, Petrograd
1919-1922  - Fleet Command School, Petrograd
1922-1926  - Naval School, Petrograd, Leningrad
1926-1936  - M.V. Frunze Naval School, Leningrad
1936-1939  - M.V. Frunze Red Banner Naval School, Leningrad
1939-1951  - M.V. Frunze Orders of Lenin and Red Banner Higher Naval School, Leningrad, Astrakhan, Baku, Leningrad
1951-1962  - M.V. Frunze Red Banner Orders of Lenin, Red Banner, and Ushakov Higher Naval School, Leningrad
1962-2002  - M.V. Frunze Orders of Lenin, Red Banner, and Ushakov Higher Naval School, Leningrad, Saint Petersburg
2002–present - Peter the Great Naval Corps - Orders of Lenin, Red Banner, and Ushakov Saint Petersburg Naval Institute, Saint Petersburg

Distinguished graduates

1745 - Chichagov, Vasiliy Yakovlevich
1758 - Povalishin, Illarion Afanasyevich
1766 - Ushakov, Fedor Fedorovich
1780 - Senyavin, Dmitriy Nikolayevich
1788 - Lysianskyi, Yuriy Fedorovich
1793 - Golovnin, Vasiliy Mikhailovich
1797 - Bellingsgausen, Fadey Fadeyevich
1818 - Nakhimov, Petr Stepanovich
1818 - Vrangel, Ferdinand Petrovich
1823 - Kornilov, Vladimir Alekseyevich
1823 - Novosilskiy, Fedor Mikhailovich
1832 - Gennady Ivanovich Nevelskoy
1894 - Kolchak, Aleksandr Vasilyevich
1926 - Kuznetsov, Nikolay Gerasimovich
1931 - Gadzhiev, Magomet Imadutinovich
1931 - Gorshkov, Sergey Georgiyevich
1931 - Kasatonov, Vladimir Afanasyevich
1956 - Chernavin, Vladimir Nikolayevich

See also
 Naval Cadet Corps (Russia)

References

Naval academies
Military education and training in Russia
Russian Navy
Universities in Saint Petersburg
Soviet Navy
Military academies of the Soviet Union